Abdallah bin Fathallah bin Nasrallah Marrash (Arabic: , ; 14 May 1839 January 17, 1900) was a Syrian writer involved in various Arabic-language newspaper ventures in London and Paris.

Life
Abdallah Marrash was born in Aleppo, a city of Ottoman Syria (present-day Syria), to an old Melkite family of merchants known for their literary interests. Having earned wealth and standing in the 18th century, the family was well established in Aleppo, although they had gone through troubles: a relative of Abdallah, Butrus Marrash, was killed by the walis troops in the midst of a Catholic–Orthodox clash in April 1818. Other Melkite Catholics were exiled from Aleppo during the persecutions, among them the priest Jibrail Marrash. Abdallah's father, Fathallah, tried to defuse the Sectarian conflict by writing a treatise in 1849, in which he rejected the Filioque. He had built up a large private library to give his three children Francis, Abdallah and Maryana a thorough education, particularly in the field of Arabic language and literature.

Aleppo was then a major intellectual center of the Ottoman Empire, featuring many thinkers and writers concerned with the future of the Arabs. It was in the French missionary schools that the Marrash family learnt Arabic with French, and other foreign languages (Italian and English). After studying in Aleppo, Abdallah went to Europe to pursue his studies while devoting himself to trade.

Having established himself in Manchester by 1863, he became a naturalized British subject on 6 May 1868 under Aliens Act 1844, and on 11 July 1872 under Naturalization Act 1870. He accessed the collections of Arabic manuscripts in London and Paris and copied what he thought was useful to his Middle Eastern compatriots. In 1879, he helped Adib Ishaq found the Parisian journal Misr al-Qahira (Egypt the Victorious). Marrash founded Kawkab al-Mashriq (The Star of the Orient), a monthly Parisian Arabic-French bilingual journal, the first issue of which was published on June 23, 1882; it was ephemeral. In 1882, Marrash settled down in Marseille, where he died on January 17, 1900. He had been a member of the Société Asiatique.

Notes

References

Sources

1839 births
1900 deaths
People from Aleppo
Syrian Melkite Greek Catholics
Syrian writers
Members of the Société Asiatique
Nahda
Naturalised citizens of the United Kingdom
Syrian emigrants to the United Kingdom